The Czech Social Democratic Party (ČSSD) leadership election of 1995 was held in April 1995. Miloš Zeman was reelected as the leader of the party. Zeman received 314 votes of 374.

References

Czech Social Democratic Party leadership elections
Single-candidate elections
Social Democratic Party leadership election
Czech Social Democratic Party leadership election
Indirect elections
Czech Social Democratic Party leadership election